Benedict House may refer to:

in the United States (by state then city)
Dunning–Benedict House, Denver, Colorado, listed on the NRHP in downtown Denver
Francis Benedict Jr. House, Norfolk, Connecticut, listed on the NRHP in Litchfield County
Benedict House and Shop, Ridgefield, Connecticut, listed on the NRHP in Fairfield County
Benedict–Miller House, Waterbury, Connecticut, listed on the NRHP in New Haven County
Benedict House (Lawrence, Kansas), listed on the NRHP in Douglas County
Benedict House (Portsmouth, New Hampshire), listed on the NRHP in Rockingham County
Sarah Benedict House, Cleveland, Ohio, listed on the NRHP in Cleveland
Dr. David De Forest Benedict House, Norwalk, Ohio, listed on the NRHP in Huron County 
Reuben Benedict House, Marengo, Ohio, listed on the NRHP in Morrow County
Edwin E. Benedict House, Florence, Oregon, listed on the NRHP in Lane County